Corey Paul Davis,  (born March 10, 1987), who goes by the stage name Corey Paul, is an American Christian hip hop musician from Houston, Texas. His debut album, Grace Love Mercy, released on July 30, 2013 by Frontline Media Group. This album was his Billboard chart debut album. In March 2015, Corey Paul was signed onto Collision Records, by December he released his second Billboard charting album, "Today Tomorrow Forever". In July 2017 he announced his departure from Collision Records.

Early life
Corey Paul was born on March 10, 1987, as Corey Paul Davis, in Houston, Texas.

Corey was raised by his mother and his stepfather, who eventually became a crack cocaine addict. At the age of six his father beat and burned his mother with an iron, and by the age of eight he witnessed his mother shoot his father in self-defense. When Corey was nine his father hung himself in an attic after a long battle with addiction.

As a teenager Corey embraced the street culture, party life and Houston's “chopped and screwed” music scene. Eventually he realized that even if he gained all of it, it wouldn't change the pain, poverty or hopelessness that his family and neighborhood dealt with on a daily basis. It was at this moment Corey decided to trust God and in 2010 he started “Frontline Media Group”, a record label that creates and promotes music with a message of hope, positivity and a belief in something greater than the struggle.

Music career
Corey Paul's first album, Grace Love Mercy, was released on July 30, 2013, with Frontline Movement. This was his debut album on the Billboard charts, and it happened to land a placement on Top Gospel Albums at No. 39.  He then signed with Collision Records and released his sophomore album, “Today, Tomorrow, Forever," on December 18, 2015. The album peaked at #11 on the iTunes Rap/Hip-Hop chart and ranked #16 on the Billboard “Heatseeker” chart. He announced his departure from Collision Records in 2017 and then independently released his third album, "Untold Story: Trill Young King" on November 11, 2017.

Personal life
Corey Paul is married to Summer, and they are presently residing in Houston, Texas, and attend church at Resurrection Houston

Discography

Studio albums

References

1987 births
Living people
African-American male rappers
African-American Christians
Musicians from Houston
American performers of Christian hip hop music
Rappers from Houston
21st-century American rappers
21st-century American male musicians
21st-century African-American musicians
20th-century African-American people